Ahmed Shibani is a senior aide to radical Shia cleric Muqtada al-Sadr, whose political movement plays a key role in Iraq's power-sharing coalition.

Mr Shibani met Nouri Maliki hours after Iraqi government officials said they were talking with insurgent groups.

The US-led coalition said Mr Shibani could help moderate extremism in Iraq.

In a statement, the coalition said leaders judged that Mr Shibani "could play a potentially important role in helping to moderate extremism and foster reconciliation in Iraq."

The US military jailed Mr Shibani at a military prison more than two years ago after detaining him during an uprising against the occupation 
in the Shia town of Najaf.

References

Iraqi politicians
Iraqi Shia Muslims
Living people
Year of birth missing (living people)